The Latin American Union of News Agencies (Spanish: Unión Latinoamericana de Noticias), or ULAN, is an alliance of news agencies based in Latin America. It was formed in Caracas, Venezuela, in 2011.

Members 

As of 2014, the ULAN consists of nine members:

 Agência Brasil 
 ABI 
 Prensa Latina 
 ANDES
 Notimex 
 Andina 
 Agencia Venezolana de Noticias 
 Latin America News Agency
 Secretariat of Communications (Uruguay)

See also 
 Caribbean Media Corporation (CMC)
 Union of South American Nations

References

External links 

 [still unknown Homepage]

International organizations based in the Americas